Moyne, County Tipperary is a civil parish in the barony of Eliogarty, North Tipperary, Ireland.

Notes

Civil parishes of Eliogarty